Philander Smith College is a private historically black college in Little Rock, Arkansas. It is affiliated with the United Methodist Church and is a founding member of the United Negro College Fund (UNCF). Philander Smith College is accredited by the Higher Learning Commission.

History 

Philander Smith College was officially founded in 1877 under the name of Walden Seminary to provide educational opportunities for emancipated slaves west of the Mississippi River. In 1882 the school was renamed Philander Smith College in honor of the financial contributions of Adeline Smith, widow of Philander Smith.  It was chartered as a four-year college in 1883 and conferred its first bachelor's degree in 1888.  In 1933, it merged the assets of the George R. Smith College in Sedalia, Missouri, which burned down in 1925. In 1943, Philander Smith was accredited by the North Central Association of Colleges and Schools.

During the Civil Rights Movement, Philander Smith College was a pioneer in activism: many of its students engaged in nonviolent resistance against segregation laws or customs (such as sitting in at "whites-only" lunch counters).

Rankings and Education Conservancy
Dr. Walter Kimbrough, former president of Philander Smith College, joined the Education Conservancy in criticizing the annual U.S. News & World Report college rankings; he signed a letter circulating among college presidents that asks them to refrain from participating in the peer assessment portion of the survey.

Campus

The school campus is located in central Little Rock. Interstate 630 (the Mills Freeway) was constructed just north of the campus, which is bounded by 10th and 14th streets to the north and south, and Gaines and Chester streets to the east and west. The core of the campus was originally built for Little Rock Junior College (now the University of Arkansas at Little Rock), and a two-block section of it is listed on the National Register of Historic Places. One of its centerpieces is the former U.M. Rose School building, now the Cox Administration Building, designed by the noted Arkansas architect John Parks Almand in 1915, when he was working for Charles L. Thompson.  The campus also includes the "Old Gym", a gymnasium built by the WPA during the Great Depression; and a former barracks building of the Camp Robinson Air Force Base, which was moved here in 1948.

Athletics 
The Philander Smith athletic teams are called the Panthers. The college is a member of the National Association of Intercollegiate Athletics (NAIA), primarily competing in the Gulf Coast Athletic Conference (GCAC) since the 2011–12 academic year. The Panthers previously competed as an NAIA Independent within the Association of Independent Institutions (AII) from 2009–10 to 2010–11.

Philander Smith competes in 10 intercollegiate varsity sports: Men's sports include basketball, cross country and track & field (indoor and outdoor); while women's sports include basketball, cross country, track & field (indoor and outdoor) and volleyball; and co-ed sports include cheerleading.

Accomplishments
The 2012–13 Philander Smith men's basketball team made history by bringing home their first GCAC conference tournament title.

On February 21, 1989, the Philander Smith women's basketball team gained a 92–89 victory over Rust College of Holly Springs, Mississippi, on their court, ending the longest home-court winning streak in NCAA Division III women's basketball history.

Notable alumni 

Devon Scott (born 1994), basketball player in the Israel Basketball Premier League

Notable faculty

See also

National Register of Historic Places listings in Little Rock, Arkansas

References

External links 

 
 Official athletics website

 
1877 establishments in Arkansas
Colonial Revival architecture in Arkansas
Educational institutions established in 1877
Historic districts on the National Register of Historic Places in Arkansas
Historically black universities and colleges in the United States
National Register of Historic Places in Little Rock, Arkansas
Private universities and colleges in Arkansas
Reconstruction Era
Universities and colleges in Little Rock, Arkansas